The Servile Wars were a series of three slave revolts ("servile" is derived from "servus", Latin for "slave") in the late Roman Republic.

Wars
 First Servile War (135−132 BC)  —  in Sicily, led by Eunus, a former slave claiming to be a prophet, and Cleon from Cilicia.
 Second Servile War (104−100 BC) — in Sicily, led by Athenion and Tryphon.
 Third Servile War  (73−71 BC) — on mainland Italy, led by Spartacus.

See also 
 
 Slavery in ancient Rome
 
 Latrocinium

References

130s BC conflicts
100s BC conflicts
70s BC conflicts
2nd century BC in the Roman Republic
1st century BC in the Roman Republic
 
Roman Republican civil wars
Wars involving the Roman Republic

pl:Powstanie niewolników na Sycylii